The 1982 Brabantse Pijl was the 22nd edition of the Brabantse Pijl cycle race and was held on 28 March 1982. The race started in Sint-Genesius-Rode and finished in Alsemberg. The race was won by Claude Criquielion.

General classification

References

1982
Brabantse Pijl